Nadia Mimoun (born 28 December 1978) is a French rhythmic gymnast. She competed in the women's group all-around event at the 1996 Summer Olympics.

References

1978 births
Living people
French rhythmic gymnasts
Olympic gymnasts of France
Gymnasts at the 1996 Summer Olympics
Sportspeople from Montpellier